Veisiejai Manor was a residential manor in Veisiejai, Lazdijai district. The manor has one of the oldest parks in Lithuania, however only one pavilion remained until nowadays, which was reconstructed.

References

Manor houses in Lithuania
Classicism architecture in Lithuania